Down to Earth is the debut studio album by American popular music singer-songwriter Jimmy Buffett. It was produced by Travis Turk and was released in 1970 on Andy Williams's Barnaby Records label as Z 30093. A compact disc was released by Varèse Sarabande in June 1998.

Due to its limited initial appeal (it only sold a few hundred copies), long periods out of general release, and stylistic differences with the rest of Buffett's work, Down to Earth (along with the similar High Cumberland Jubilee) was often not considered part of the chronology of Buffett albums by fans or even Buffett himself.

Songs
All of the songs on Down to Earth were written or co-written by Buffett. "The Captain and the Kid" was re-recorded thrice by Buffett: Havaña Daydreamin', Meet Me in Margaritaville: The Ultimate Collection and Songs You Don’t Know By Heart.

The folk-rock style of music and lyrics on Down to Earth and High Cumberland Jubilee differ greatly from Buffett's subsequent output. There is less of the country music feel and little of the gulf and western, Key-West-influenced sound and themes that have defined his musical career. Allmusic reviewer William Ruhlmann notes that "this is not the freewheeling Jimmy Buffett of 'Margaritaville,' but rather a thoughtful folk-rock singer/songwriter of the early '70s, earnestly strumming an acoustic guitar over a rhythm section and singing lyrics of social consciousness with sly references to drugs".

The material on this album has been included on numerous compilations of Buffett's early material.

An alternate take of "Captain America" was released as the third single from the album.

Alternate versions
The 1998 re-release of the album contained an additional track, "Richard Frost," which was recorded during sessions for the album and released as the B-side of "The Christian?" single.

Track listings
All tracks composed by Jimmy Buffett except where indicated

Original release
Side A:
"The Christian?" (Milton Brown, Jimmy Buffett) 3:54
"Ellis Dee (He Ain't Free)"  (Buffett, Buzz Cason) 2:50
"The Missionary" 3:33
"A Mile High in Denver" 3:07
"The Captain and the Kid" 3:18
Side B:
"Captain America" 3:28
"Ain't He a Genius" 2:43
"Turnabout" 4:20
"There's Nothin' Soft About Hard Times" 3:23
"I Can't Be Your Hero Today" 2:58
"Truckstop Salvation" 5:48

1998 re-release
"The Christian?" (Brown, Buffett) 3:54
"Ellis Dee (He Ain't Free)" (Buffett, Cason) 2:50
"Richard Frost" 3:29
'The Missionary" 3:33
"A Mile High in Denver" 3:07
"The Captain and the Kid" 3:18
"Captain America" 3:28
"Ain't He a Genius" 2:43
"Turnabout" 4:20
"There's Nothin' Soft about Hard Times" 3:23
"I Can't Be Your Hero Today" 2:58
"Truckstop Salvation" 5:48

Personnel
 Jimmy Buffett – lead and backing vocals, guitar, kazoo
 Lanny Fiel – guitar, piano
 Bob Cook – guitar, bass, harmonica
Dave Haney – bass
Carl Himmel – drums
 Paul Tabet – drums
Bob Cook – harmonica
Travis Turk – drums, kazoo
Buzz Cason – backing vocals
Technical
Travis Turk – producer, engineer

Singles
"The Christian?" b/w "Richard Frost" (Released on Barnaby ZS7-2013 circa May 1970)
"Ellis Dee (He Ain't Free)" b/w "There's Nothing Soft about Hard Times" (Released on Barnaby ZS7-2019 circa September 1970)
"Captain America" b/w "Truckstop Salvation" (Released on Barnaby ZS7-2023 in January 1971)

Notes

1970 debut albums
Barnaby Records albums
Jimmy Buffett albums
Varèse Sarabande albums